The Alltwen television relay station is sited on a hill to the southwest of Pontardawe in the Swansea Valley, at least a kilometre away from the village of Alltwen from which it takes its name. It was originally built in the late 1980s as a fill-in relay for UHF analogue colour television. It consists of a 17 m self-supporting lattice mast standing on Craig Glyn Meirch, a hillside which is itself about 140 m above sea level (about 90 m above the valley floor). The transmitters are beamed northwards and eastwards to cater for those digital terrestrial TV subscribers in the towns of Pontardawe and Alltwen who for reasons of geography can't get a signal from the much bigger and more powerful Pontardawe transmitter. The Alltwen transmission station is owned and operated by Arqiva.

Alltwen transmitter re-radiates the signal received off-air from Kilvey Hill about 12 km to the southwest. When it came, the digital switchover process for Alltwen duplicated the timing at the parent station, with the first stage taking place on Wednesday 12 August 2009 and the second stage was completed on Wednesday 9 September 2009, with the Kilvey Hill transmitter-group becoming the first in Wales to complete digital switchover. After the switchover process, analogue channels had ceased broadcasting permanently and the Freeview digital TV services were radiated at an ERP of 2 W each.

Channels listed by frequency

Analogue television

10 March 1989 - 12 August 2009
Alltwen (being in Wales) transmitted the S4C variant of Channel 4.

Analogue and digital television

12 August 2009 - 9 September 2009
The UK's digital switchover commenced at Kilvey Hill (and therefore at Alltwen and all its other relays) on 12 August 2009. Analogue BBC Two Wales on channel 46 was first to close, and ITV Wales was moved from channel 43 to channel 46 for its last month of service. Channel 43 was replaced by the new digital BBC A mux which started up in 64-QAM and at full power (i.e. 2 W).

Digital television

9 September 2009 - present
The remaining analogue TV services were closed down and the digital multiplexes took over on the original analogue channels' frequencies.

13 March 2013
As a side-effect of frequency-changes elsewhere in the region to do with clearance of the 800 MHz band for 4G mobile phone use, Alltwen's "BBC B" multiplex will have to be moved from channel 50 to channel 40.

References

External links
The Transmission Gallery: Alltwen

Transmitter sites in Wales
Wenvoe UHF 625-line Transmitter Group